was a Japanese swimmer who competed at the 1932 Summer Olympics in Los Angeles.

A native of Ōgaki, Hiroshima (currently part of the city of Etajima, Hiroshima), Kawaishi was a graduate of the law school of Keio University, and began competitive swimming as a student.

Selected for the Japanese Olympic team in the 1932 Los Angeles Olympics, he won a silver medal in the 100 m freestyle event; however, his achievement was overshadowed by his teammate Yasuji Miyazaki, who won the gold medal and who set a new Olympic record. After his return to Japan, he became an instructor at the Imperial Japanese Naval Academy from 1933 to 1935. He then moved to Osaka, and was employed by the forerunner of Kansai Electric; however, he then enlisted in the Imperial Japanese Army and was accepted into the Hiroshima-based IJA 11th Infantry Regiment. He was sent to serve on the front lines in China during the Second Sino-Japanese War and was promoted to first lieutenant after five years. Upon is discharge, he returned to work at Kansai Electric; however, during the Pacific War, as the situation worsened for Japan, he was recalled to active duty in June 1944 and was assigned to the garrison at Iwo Jima, where General Tadamichi Kuribayashi made him commander of the northern district of the island. He was killed in combat during the Battle of Iwo Jima on March 17, 1945, and was posthumously promoted to captain.

References

External links
profile
The another Olympic medalist dead in Iwo Jima,Kawaishi Tastugo(Japanese)

1911 births
1945 deaths
People from Etajima, Hiroshima
Military personnel from Hiroshima Prefecture
Keio University alumni
Olympic swimmers of Japan
Swimmers at the 1932 Summer Olympics
Olympic silver medalists for Japan
Imperial Japanese Army personnel of World War II
Japanese military personnel killed in World War II
Battle of Iwo Jima
Medalists at the 1932 Summer Olympics
Japanese male freestyle swimmers
Olympic silver medalists in swimming
Imperial Japanese Army officers